James May's Big Ideas is a three-part British television miniseries in which James May, a journalist and self-acknowledged geek travels the globe in search of implementations for concepts widely considered science fiction, or his big ideas. The series was produced by the BBC and the Open University and began airing at 8pm on Sundays on 28 September 2008.

The first episode documents his search for the ultimate form of personal transport, ranging from jetpacks to flying cars. In the second episode, May looks at bionics and robotics and if robots can exceed the boundaries of their programming. The third episode focuses on energy.

Episode list

See also
James May's 20th Century – series broadcast on the BBC with a similar format involving inventions.

External links

James May's Big Ideas at Open2.net

Big Ideas
BBC television documentaries
2008 British television series debuts
2008 British television series endings